Calliostoma layardi is a species of sea snail, a marine gastropod mollusk in the family Calliostomatidae.

Description
The size of the shell varies between 12 mm and 25 mm.

Distribution
This species occurs in the Indian Ocean from Southern Transkei to Southern KwaZuluNatal, South Africa.

References

 Kilburn, R.N. & Rippey, E. (1982) Sea Shells of Southern Africa. Macmillan South Africa, Johannesburg, xi + 249 pp. page(s): 39 
 Petit R.E. (2009) George Brettingham Sowerby, I, II & III: their conchological publications and molluscan taxa. Zootaxa 2189: 1–218

External links
 
 Contributions to the knowledge of South African marine Mollusca. Part IV; Annals of the South African Museum. v 47 1963-1974

layardi
Gastropods described in 1897